This is a list of notable events in music that took place in the year 1998.

Specific locations
1998 in British music
1998 in Norwegian music
1998 in South Korean music

Specific genres
1998 in classical music
1998 in country music
1998 in heavy metal music
1998 in hip hop music
1998 in Latin music
1998 in jazz

Events

January
January 28
Interscope Records pays a radio station in Portland, Oregon, USA, $5000 to play the Limp Bizkit single "Counterfeit" fifty times. The business move is widely criticized in the media as "payola", but the controversy serves to further increase publicity for the band.
"Weird Al" Yankovic gets LASIK surgery to cure his myopia. At the same time, he grows out his hair and shaves off his moustache, radically changing his signature look.
Namie Amuro's first greatest hits album, 181920, is released.
January 31 – The Presidents of the United States of America play a farewell show in their hometown of Seattle. They would reunite in 2000.

February
February 5 
Carnatic vocalist M. S. Subbulakshmi becomes the first musician ever to be awarded the Bharat Ratna, India's highest civilian award.
Former Judas Priest frontman Rob Halford publicly reveals his homosexuality for the first time in an interview with MTV.
February 15 – Sir Edward Elgar's unfinished Third Symphony, completed by Anthony Payne, is performed for the first time at the Royal Festival Hall, London, UK.
February 19 – The Stray Cats reunite for a benefit show for the Carl Perkins Foundation at House of Blues in Los Angeles, USA.
February 21 – Misia makes her official CD debut with the single "Tsutsumikomu Yō ni...".
February 23 – "Frozen", the first single from Madonna's eighth studio album, Ray of Light, is released. The single is a worldwide hit, peaking at #2 on US Billboard Hot 100 and becoming her first single to enter the charts at #1 in the UK.
February 24 – Elton John is knighted by Queen Elizabeth II of the United Kingdom at Buckingham Palace, London, UK. He was mistakenly introduced as "Sir John Elton", but was renamed "Sir Elton John".
February 25 – The 40th Annual Grammy Awards are presented in New York, hosted by Kelsey Grammer. Bob Dylan, Alison Krauss and R. Kelly all win three awards each, with Dylan winning Album of the Year for Time Out of Mind. Shawn Colvin's "Sunny Came Home" wins both Record of the Year and Song of the Year. Paula Cole wins Best New Artist.
February 28 – Haitian group RAM survive an attempted murder while performing at a carnival, after a disagreement with the newly elected mayor of Port-au-Prince.

March
March 3 – Madonna releases her seventh studio album Ray of Light. The album eventually sells over 16 million copies worldwide. The album received near universal acclaim upon release. Her collaborations with producer William Orbit, as well as her conversion to Kabbalah resulted in a completely new and unique lyric and musical approach for Madonna, which gains her four Grammy Awards out of a total of six nominations, as well as many other prestigious awards. 
March 10 – The South Korean-made MPMan, the first mass-produced digital audio player, is launched at the CeBIT trade fair in Hanover, Germany.
March 13 – The Smashing Pumpkins file a US$1 million lawsuit against UK-based Sound And Media Ltd, alleging that the company has released a book and CD about the band without permission.
March 17 – Van Halen III is released. It is the first and only Van Halen album to feature Gary Cherone on vocals.
March 24 – NSYNC releases their debut album NSYNC.
March 26 – Chuck Negron files a lawsuit against his fellow Three Dog Night bandmates alleging that they broke a 1990 settlement agreement and interfered with his career.

April
April 3 – Dave Navarro is fired by the Red Hot Chili Peppers. 
April 6 – Organizers announce that Lollapalooza will not be staged in 1998 due to the inability to sign a major headlining act. The festival would return in 2003.
April 7 – George Michael is arrested in a public restroom in Beverly Hills, California, USA for lewd conduct. He is subsequently sentenced to community service, and later describes it as a "subconsciously deliberate act".
April 8 – Ayumi Hamasaki makes her debut under Avex Trax with the single "Poker Face".
April 14 – The first VH1 Divas Live concert is broadcast on VH1, starring Aretha Franklin, Gloria Estefan, Céline Dion, Shania Twain and Mariah Carey.
April 17–19 – The second Terrastock festival takes place in San Francisco, USA.
April 29 – Steven Tyler breaks his knee at a concert in Anchorage, Alaska, USA, delaying Aerosmith's Nine Lives Tour and necessitating camera angle adjustments for the filming of the video for "I Don't Want to Miss a Thing".

May
May 5 – South Korean boy band, Shinhwa debut under SM Entertainment. 
May 8 
The third European Festival of Youth Choirs is held in Basel, Switzerland.
A British court rules in favor of the Beatles and John Lennon's widow, Yoko Ono, stopping the release of another Live at the Star Club recording. All copies of the recording and the original tape are awarded to the Beatles, as well as damages and legal costs.
May 9 – The 43rd Eurovision Song Contest, held in Birmingham, United Kingdom, is won by Israel's transsexual performer Dana International with the song "Diva" See: 1998 – Diggiloo Thrush
May 19 – Namie Amuro's son Haruto is born.
May 26 – Anggun releases her debut album, Snow on the Sahara in North America, which would go on to sell 1 million copies across Europe and America and becoming the best-selling album by Asian artist outside Asia.
May 27 – Ringo Sheena releases her debut single "Kōfukuron".
May 31 – Geri Halliwell goes into hiding as her public relations representative, Julian Torton, confirms that she has left the Spice Girls permanently.

June
June 1 – Scott Weiland's public problems with drugs continue when he is arrested in New York after buying heroin.

July
July 3 – Westlife is formally created and signed to the record label BMG.
July 5 – Teen singer Billie Piper starts her career by becoming the youngest British solo artist to debut at #1 on the UK singles charts with "Because We Want To".
July 17 – Aiko makes her major label debut with the song "Ashita".

August
August 1 – VH1 Smooth is launched. The first music video played is a cover of "Makin' Whoopee" by Branford Marsalis.
August 18 – Korn's third studio album, Follow the Leader, enters Billboard 200 at number 1, with 268,000 copies sold in its first week. It goes on to be certified 5× Platinum by the RIAA and sell over 14 million copies worldwide, thus launching nu metal into the mainstream.
August 20 – Cirith Ungol founding guitarist Jerry Fogle dies from liver failure. 
August 24 – Pearl Jam's "Do the Evolution" video premieres on MTV's 120 Minutes; it is the group's first music video in six years.
August 25 – Lauryn Hill releases her breakthrough debut album The Miseducation Of Lauryn Hill. The album goes on to be certified 7× Platinum by the RIAA and sell over 19 million copies worldwide.
August 29 – The Bee Gees open their One Night Only tour in Dublin, Ireland

September
September 14 – Total Request Live is broadcast for the first time on MTV.
September 16 – Lou Reed performs for President of the Czech Republic Václav Havel at the White House.
September 28 – Britney Spears' debut single, "...Baby One More Time", is released. It would become the top-selling single of 1999, selling over ten million units worldwide. It was also the biggest hit single of 1999. The "...Baby One More Time" music video was ranked as number three on Billboard's 2010 list of "Best Music Videos of All Time".

October
October 5 – MuchMoreMusic is launched in Canada.
October 6 – Kurupt's debut studio album, Kuruption!, is released by Antra Records. It peaked at #8 on the Billboard 200 on October 24, 1998.
October 8 – The Recording Industry Association of America files in court against Diamond Multimedia in an attempt to block the release of the new Rio PMP300, arguing that the MP3 digital audio player is a music piracy device. The RIAA's application is denied on October 26, clearing the way for the PMP300 to become the first commercially successful MP3 player.
October 19 – "Believe", the first single of Cher's twenty-second studio album of the same name is released, becoming a super smash hit. After seven consecutive weeks atop of the UK official singles chart, it became the best selling single in that country, also the best selling single by a female artist in UK history. On March 13, 1999, Believe became Cher's 5th number one single in US, spending four consecutive weeks at #1 and becoming the best selling single of that year.
October 22 – Cher releases her twenty-second studio album Believe, which became the most successful of her career: it peaked at number one in seven countries, #4 in US and #7 in UK. The album has sold over 20 million copies worldwide and is certified platinum (or more) in at least sixteen countries, becoming one of the highest selling albums of all time.
October 27 – The Copyright Term Extension Act is signed into law, giving the entertainment industry 20 more years of exclusive rights to all works created since 1923.

November
November 17 – The Offspring release Americana to massive mainstream success. It goes on to be certified 5× platinum by the RIAA and sells over 11 million copies worldwide. The hit single "Pretty Fly (for a White Guy)" becomes one of the best charting worldwide punk songs of all time, topping charts in 9 countries.

December
December 5 
Young violinists Nicola Benedetti and Alina Ibragimova play Bach's double violin concerto under the baton of Yehudi Menuhin at the opening ceremony of the 50th Anniversary of the Universal Declaration of Human Rights at UNESCO in Paris.
Billboard changes its policy for its Hot 100 chart to allow airplay-only singles or album cuts to be accounted in the chart.
December 9 – Hikaru Utada makes her debut with the double A-side single "Automatic (Hikaru Utadasong)" / "Time Will Tell".
December 23 – Namie Amuro returns to the music industry with the single "I Have Never Seen".
December 29 – India issues a set of postage stamps on the subject of Indian musical instruments.

Also in 1998
The Royal Liverpool Philharmonic Orchestra launches its own recording label, RLPO Live.
Singers Brandy and Monica dominate the Billboard charts with the duet, "The Boy Is Mine", holding the Billboard Hot 100 No. 1 spot for 13 weeks.
Composer John Harbison was awarded a Heinz Award for the Arts and Humanities.
The Goo Goo Dolls single, "Iris", set a new Billboard Hot 100 Airplay record in the U.S. by achieving 18 weeks at number one.
Six Feet Under hire Steve Swanson.
SWV disbands.

Bands formed
See Musical groups established in 1998

Bands reformed
Modern Talking
Culture Club

Bands disbanded

See Musical groups disestablished in 1998

Albums released

January–March

April–June

July–September

October–December

Release date unknown
The Bullies Have All Gone to Rest - John Hartford & Jim Wood
The First 40 Years, The Very Best of – Hank Marvin and The Shadows (2 CDs)
Hometown – Hush
Live at the Beeb – Nazareth
Deviate – Kill II This
Majesty – The Anniversary 
Six Organs of Admittance – Six Organs of Admittance 
The Star and the Wiseman: The Best of Ladysmith Black Mambazo – Ladysmith Black Mambazo
Sum of the Parts – Ed Summerlin
Through the Trees – The Handsome Family
Youth Is Wasted on the Young – Caesars
Va Va Voom – Cinerama

Biggest hit singles
The following singles achieved the highest aggregated chart positions in 1998, according to TsorT.

Top 40 Chart hit singles

Other Chart hit singles

Notable singles

Other Notable singles

Classical music
Leonardo Balada – Folk Dreams (Three Pieces for Orchestra)
Osvaldas Balakauskas – Symphony No. 4
Louis Andriessen – Writing to Vermeer
John Barry – The Beyondness of Things
George Crumb – Mundus Canis (A Dog's World) for guitar and percussion
Mario Davidovsky – String Quartet No. 5
Ludovico Einaudi – Arie
Lorenzo Ferrero – A Red Wedding Dress, for organ
Beat Furrer
Still for ensemble
Spur for piano and string quartet 
Philip Glass – Days and Nights in Rocinha, for orchestra
Georg Friedrich Haas
Concerto for violin and orchestra
String Quartet No. 2
Jake Heggie – Sophie's Song
Wojciech Kilar – What a piece of work is a man, movie theme from “A Week in the Life of a Man”
Frederik Magle – Cantata to Saint Cecilia
Gordon McPherson – Miami
Hans Otte – Stundenbuch for piano
Zbigniew Preisner – Requiem for My Friend
Einojuhani Rautavaara – Piano Concerto No. 3 Gift of Dreams
Vache Sharafyan – The Sun, the Wine and the Wind of Time, for duduk, violin, cello and piano
Juan Maria Solare – Spaghettisssimo
Morton Subotnick – Echoes from the Silent Call of Girona

Opera
Mark Adamo – Little Women
Christopher Butterfield – Zurich 1916
Philip Glass – White Raven
Heinz Holliger – Schneewittchen
Constantine Koukias – The Divine Kiss
Ryan Ostrander – Madame Butterfly

Jazz

Musical theater
March 5 – The Boy from Oz, Sydney production opened.
Notre-Dame de Paris – musical
Cabaret (Kander and Ebb) – Broadway revival
Footloose – Broadway production opened at the Richard Rodgers Theatre and ran for 709 performances
Hedwig and the Angry Inch (Stephen Trask) – off Broadway production
High Society – Broadway production opened at the St James Theatre and ran for 144 performances
Ragtime – Broadway production at the Ford Center for the Performing Arts and ran for 834 performances
The Sound of Music (Rodgers & Hammerstein) – Broadway revival

Musical films
Blues Brothers 2000
Meeting People Is Easy
Mulan
The Prince of Egypt
Velvet Goldmine
Why Do Fools Fall in Love

Births
January 4 – Coco Jones, American actress and singer
January 11 – Louisa Johnson, English singer-songwriter
January 22 – Silentó, American rapper, singer-songwriter, record producer, and actor
January 23 – XXXTentacion, American rapper and singer-songwriter (d. 2018)
January 29 – Mion Mukaichi, Japanese girl group singer 
February 8 – Šarlote Lēnmane, Latvian singer-songwriter
February 11 – Khalid, American singer-songwriter 
 February 20 
 Corbin, American singer-songwriter and record producer
 Gracey (singer), English singer
 March 24 - Ethel Cain, American singer-songwriter, artist and producer 
 April 2 - Peach PRC, Australian pop singer, songwriter, social media personality, and performer
April 3 – Paris Jackson, American actor, singer, dancer, musician, activist and model (daughter of Michael Jackson)
April 20 – Felix Mallard, Australian musician, actor and model
April 21 – Zé Felipe, Brazilian singer
May 4 – Rex Orange County, English singer-songwriter and musician 
May 23 – Steve Lacy, American singer-songwriter, musician, and member of American band, The Internet
May 28 – Dahyun, South Korean singer (TWICE)
June 24 – Tana Mongeau, American rapper and internet personality 
July 1 – Chloe Bailey of Chloe x Halle, American singer and actress
July 8 
 Jaden Smith, American actor, rapper, singer and songwriter (son of Will Smith and Jada Pinkett Smith, brother of Willow Smith) 
 Maya Hawke, American actress, model and singer-songwriter (daughter of Ethan Hawke and Uma Thurman) 
July 15 – Kailee Morgue, American singer-songwriter, activist
July 18 – Luísa Sonza, Brazilian singer-songwriter
July 21 – Maggie Lindemann, American singer-songwriter
July 28 – Risa Watanabe, Japanese idol and model
August 4 – Lil Skies, American rapper 
August 8 – Shawn Mendes, Canadian musician, singer-songwriter, voice actor and model. (Frequent collaborator with Camila Cabello) 
August 11 – Nadia Azzi, American classical pianist
August 14 – Doechii, American rapper
August 18 – Clairo, American singer-songwriter and electropop recording artist
August 25 
Abraham Mateo, Spanish singer and actor
China Anne McClain, American singer and actress
August 26 – Soyeon, Korean rapper, songwriter, record producer, and member of (G)I-dle 
August 29 – Bizarrap, Argentine DJ and record producer
September 15 – Kevinho, Brazilian singer
September 25 – mallrat, Australian musician
October 22 – Roddy Ricch, American rapper
October 23 
Emily Ann Roberts, American country singer 
Amandla Stenberg, American singer and actress
October 24 – Daya, American singer-songwriter
October 28 – Ellie Drennan, Australian singer-songwriter, The Voice Australia winner of series 4, Jessie J was her coach
November 23 – Emily Keener, American singer-songwriter'
November 28 - UPSAHL,  American singer-songwriter and multi-instrumentalist
December 2 – Juice WRLD, American singer, rapper, and songwriter (d. 2019)
December 5 – Conan Gray, American musician
December 15 – Cavetown, British musician and activist
December 19 – King Princess, American multi instrumentalist, singer-songwriter, activist and record producer
December 21 - Lexie Liu, Chinese singer, rapper and songwriter
December 22 - Latto, American rapper
December 24 – Declan McKenna, English singer-songwriter and musician
Unknown – Joy , Australian musician, singer and producer
Unknown - Kim Dracula,  an Australian trap metal/hardcore music artist

Deaths
January 2  – Nick Venet, record producer, 61 (Burkitt's lymphoma)
January 4 – Mae Questel, singer and actress, the voice of Betty Boop, Olive Oyl, Little Audrey & Little Lulu, 89
January 5 – Sonny Bono, singer and songwriter, 63
January 7 – Owen Bradley, record producer, 82
January 8 – Sir Michael Tippett, composer, 93
January 11 – Klaus Tennstedt, conductor, 71
January 15 – Junior Wells, harmonica player, 64
January 17  – Junior Kimbrough, blues guitarist and singer, 67
January 19 – Carl Perkins, singer 65, complications following a series of strokes
January 22 – Anselmo Sacasas, jazz pianist and bandleader, 85
January 24 – Justin Tubb, country music singer and songwriter, 62
January 26
Orlando DiGirolamo, jazz accordionist, pianist, composer, and teacher, 73 
Shinichi Suzuki, violinist and inventor of the international Suzuki method of music education, 99
February 3 – Fat Pat, American rapper (shot)
February 5
Tim Kelly, guitarist (Slaughter), 35 (car accident)
Nick Webb, jazz guitarist, 43 or 44 (pancreatic cancer)
February 6
Carl Wilson, The Beach Boys, 51 (lung cancer)
Falco, rock star, 40 (car accident)
February 10 – Alex Kramer, Canadian songwriter, 94
February 13 – Thomas Chapin, composer and saxophonist, 40 (leukemia)
February 17 – Bob Merrill, songwriter, 76 (suicide)
February 19 – Grandpa Jones, star of Hee Haw, comedian and musician, 84
February 25 – Rockin' Sidney, soul musician, 59
February 28 – Todd Duncan, first Porgy in Porgy and Bess, 95
March 8 – Roger Christian, The Christians
March 13 – Judge Dread, ska and reggae performer, 52 (heart attack on stage)
March 15 – Tim Maia, Brazilian singer and songwriter, 55
March 29 – Nada Tončić, operatic soprano, 88
March 31 – Joel Ryce-Menuhin, pianist, 64
April 1 – Rozz Williams, founder of Christian Death, suicide (hanging)
April 2 – Rob Pilatus, member of Milli Vanilli, 32
April 4 – Pierre Lantier, pianist and composer, 87
April 5 – Cozy Powell, drummer for Rainbow and Black Sabbath, 50 (car accident)
April 6 – Tammy Wynette, country singer, 55
April 7 – Wendy O. Williams, Plasmatics, 48 (suicide)
April 9 – Tom Cora, cellist and composer, 44
April 11 – Lillian Briggs, US singer and trombonist, 65 (lung cancer)
April 15 – Rose Maddox, country singer, 72
April 17 – Linda McCartney, rock photographer, keyboard player (Wings) and entrepreneur, wife of Paul McCartney, 56 (breast cancer)
May 2 – Hideto "Hide" Matsumoto, Japanese rock artist, 33, (hanging, apparently accidental)
May 5 – Tommy McCook, Jamaican saxophonist, 71
May 7 – Eddie Rabbitt, country singer, 56, lung cancer
May 9 – Alice Faye, actress and singer, 83
May 10
Lester Butler, blues harmonica player and singer, 38 (drug overdose)
Clara Rockmore, thereminist and violinist, 87
May 11 — Willy Corsari, singer and composer (100)
May 14 – Frank Sinatra, singer and actor, 82 (heart attack)
May 19 – Dorothy Donegan, jazz pianist, 76
May 20 – Robert Normann, Norwegian jazz guitarist, 81
May 22 – Royce Kendall, country musician, 62
June 2 – Ricky Hyslop, violinist, conductor, composer, and arranger, 83 
June 8 – Harry Lookofsky, jazz violinist, 84
June 10 – Steve Sanders, the Oak Ridge Boys, 45, suicide
June 25 – Lounès Matoub, assassinated
July 3 – George Lloyd, British composer, 85
July 6 – Roy Rogers, actor and singer, 86
July 14 – Herman David Koppel, pianist and composer, 89
July 21 – O'Landa Draper, O'Landa Draper and the Associates (gospel choir), 34 (renal failure)
July 23 – André Gertler, violinist, 90
July 28 – Olga De Blanck Martín, pianist, guitarist and composer, 62
August 3 – Alfred Schnittke, composer, 63
August 11 – Benny Waters, jazz saxophonist and clarinetist, 96
August 19 
Ilva Ligabue, operatic soprano, 66
Sylvia Stahlman, operatic soprano, 69
August 22 – Sergio Fiorentino, pianist, 70
August 24 – Gene Page, arranger, producer and conductor, 58
August 25 – Lamar Crowson, pianist, 72
August 29 – Charlie Feathers, country blues musician, 66
September 4 – Lal Waterson, folk singer-songwriter, 55
September 9 – Habib Hassan Touma, composer and ethnomusicologist, 63
September 14 – Johnny Adams, blues, jazz and gospel singer, 66
September 18 – Charlie Foxx, R & B and soul musician, 58 (leukemia)
September 26 – Betty Carter, jazz singer, 69
September 30 – Pavel Štěpán, pianist, 73
October 1 – Pauline Julien, Canadian singer-songwriter and actress, 60
October 2 – Gene Autry, actor and country singer, 91
October 5 – Jacques Abram, pianist, 83
October 7 – Arnold Jacobs, American tuba player and educator, 83
October 8 – Anatol Vieru, composer, 82
October 14 – Frankie Yankovic, America's "Polka King", 83
October 17 – Antonio Agri, violinist, conductor and composer, 66
October 25 – Warren Wiebe, "Soulful Rain Man", vocalist and session artist, 45 (suicide)
November 8
Consuelo Villalon Aleman, pianist, 91 
Lonnie Pitchford, blues musician, 43 (AIDS)
November 12 – Kenny Kirkland, jazz keyboardist, 43 (congestive heart failure)
November 20 – Roland Alphonso, saxophonist, 67
November 27 – Barbara Acklin, soul singer, 55
December 4 – Egil Johansen, jazz drummer, 64
December 11 – Lynn Strait, (Snot), 30 (car accident)
December 21
Avril Coleridge-Taylor, pianist, conductor and composer, 95
Karl Denver, Scottish singer, 67
December 25 – Bryan MacLean, singer, guitarist and songwriter (Love), 52 (heart attack)
December 30 – Johnny Moore, R & B singer, 64

Awards
The following artists are inducted into the Rock and Roll Hall of Fame: The Eagles, Fleetwood Mac, The Mamas & the Papas, Lloyd Price, Santana and Gene Vincent
Inductees of the GMA Gospel Music Hall of Fame include Andrae Crouch, The Imperials, The Jordanaires and The LeFevres

ARIA Music Awards

Brit Awards

Country Music Association Awards

Eurovision Song Contest

Grammy Awards

Japan Record Awards

Juno Awards

Mercury Music Prize
Bring It On – Gomez wins.

MTV Video Music Awards

Charts

Triple J Hottest 100

See also
 1998 in music (UK)
 Musical groups established in 1998
 Record labels established in 1998

References

 
20th century in music
Music by year